Gymnoscelis idiograpta is a moth in the family Geometridae. It was described by Louis Beethoven Prout in 1935. It is found on São Tomé.

References

Moths described in 1935
idiograpta